The Citadel Bulldogs basketball teams represented The Citadel, The Military College of South Carolina in Charleston, South Carolina, United States.  The program was established in 1900–01, and has continuously fielded a team since 1912–13.  Their primary rivals are College of Charleston, Furman and VMI.

1979–80

|-
|colspan=7 align=center|1980 Southern Conference men's basketball tournament

1980–81

1981–82

|-
| colspan=7 align=center|1982 Southern Conference men's basketball tournament

1982–83

|-
| colspan=7 align=center|1983 Southern Conference men's basketball tournament

1983–84

|-
| colspan=7 align=center|1984 Southern Conference men's basketball tournament

References
 

The Citadel Bulldogs basketball seasons